Gorilla Manor is the debut album by Los Angeles based indie rock band Local Natives. It was released in the United Kingdom on November 2, 2009, on Infectious Records, and February 16, 2010, by Frenchkiss Records in the United States.

The album was self-funded by the band and recorded by Raymond Richards in his own Red Rockets Glare Studio, in West Los Angeles. It was produced in collaboration by Richards and the band. Gorilla Manor was named after the house they all shared in Orange County, where most of the album was written. “It was insanely messy and there were always friends over knocking around on guitars or our thrift store piano,” said guitarist Ryan Hahn.

The album debuted in the Billboard 200 and at #3 in the New Artist Chart.

Track listing

Personnel
Taylor Rice — vocals, rhythm guitar
Kelcey Ayer — vocals, keyboards, rhythm guitar
Ryan Hahn — lead guitar, vocals
Matthew Frazier — drums, vocals
Andy Hamm — bass, vocals

Release history

References

External links
Gorilla Manor at SoundCloud

2009 albums
Local Natives albums
Red Rockets Glare albums